Chironius carinatus, commonly known as the amazon whipsnake, or the machete savane is a long and slender, nonvenomous colubrid snake.

Geographic range
It is endemic to the regions of Colombia, northern Brazil, Costa Rica, eastern Venezuela, northern Suriname, Guyana and Trinidad and Tobago.

Description
Chironius carinatus may grow to 3 meters (9.8 feet) in length. Their body color can range from brown to deep yellow or gold, with the tail being generally darker than the body. The belly is often a bright shade of yellow or orange. In most specimens, body scales have lightly colored centers with darker edges. A light colored stripe runs down the length of the body, fading at the tail. The dorsal scales are in 12 rows.

Diet 
It feeds on frogs, lizards, mice and birds.

References 

carinatus
Reptiles of Colombia
Reptiles of Costa Rica
Reptiles of Trinidad and Tobago
Reptiles of Brazil
Reptiles of Guyana
Fauna of the Guianas
Reptiles of Venezuela
Reptiles described in 1758
Taxa named by Carl Linnaeus
Snakes of South America